Leichenschrei is the second album by the band SPK. It was released in 1982 on Thermidor Records in the United States and in 1983 on the band's own Side Effekts label in the United Kingdom. The title is a German word meaning "corpse scream", and might refer to an alleged supernatural behavior exhibited by the deceased.

The band was listed on the initial Thermidor release as "SPK", although subsequent vinyl reissues were credited to "Sozialistisches Patienten Kollektiv", a reference to the leftist German patients' group of the same name. The name was misspelled on the CD reissue as "Socialistisches Patienten Kollektiv".

Legacy
In a 1987 interview for Italian fanzine Snowdonia, Edward Ka-Spel of The Legendary Pink Dots stated that he thought industrial music should have stopped after Leichenschrei, describing it as a "brilliant album" and "nobody could make a better, more definitive work in industrial music".

Track listing
No track listing was provided with the initial release on Thermidor Records. The first side of vinyl editions of the album end with a lockgroove. Sides one and two of the vinyl editions are labeled "Seite ((Lysso))" and "Seite ((Klono))", respectively.

Side one
"Genetic Transmission" – 3:17
"Post-Mortem" – 2:24
"Desolation" – 1:18
"Napalm (Terminal Patient)" – 2:39
"Cry from the Sanatorium" – 2:26
"Baby Blue Eyes" – 2:38
"Israel" – 2:46
"Internal Bleeding" – 1:46
"Chamber Music" – 3:26

Side two
"Despair" – 4:45
"The Agony of the Plasma" – 3:03
"Day of Pigs" – 4:18
"Wars of Islam" – 4:31
"Maladia Europa (The European Sickness)" – 3:50

Personnel
According to the album liner notes:
 Oblivion (Graeme Revell) – synthesizer, electronic rhythms, tape, syncussion, vocals
 NE/H/IL (Neil Hill) – synthesizer, electronic rhythms, tape, treatments, vocals
 James Pinker – drums, syncussion, metal percussion, backing vocals
 Paul Charlier – guitar, bass, synthi
 Peter Kennard – guitar, bass
 Karel van Bergen – violin, vocals
 Sinan Leong – vocals, photography
 Brett Guerim – additional vocals
 Margaret Hill – additional vocals
 Lustmord – additional vocals
 Rose – additional vocals
 Phil Punch – mixing

Charts

Release history

Notes

1982 albums
SPK (band) albums